Ahmed Moulay Laraki (Arabic: أحمد العراقي; ‎ born 15 October 1931 – 2 November 2020) was Moroccan politician and a figure of the national movement and was the Prime Ministers of Morocco between October 6, 1969, and August 6, 1971. He was the 6th prime minister of Morocco and served under king Hassan II. He also served as the foreign minister from 1967 to 1971.

Early life 
Recognized as one of the builders of Moroccan diplomacy, Moulay Ahmed Laraki, born in Casablanca in 1931, was Prime Minister of the Kingdom of Morocco between 1969 and 1971. He was affiliated with the Istiqlal Party.

Career 
After having obtained his doctorate from the Faculty of Medicine in Paris in 1957, Ahmed Laraki moved to Casablanca to practice his profession. In 1957, he joined the cabinet of Ahmed Balafrej in the Ministry of Foreign Affairs. On 6 July 1967, he was appointed Minister of Foreign Affairs in the Mohamed Benhima government.

He then carried out a number of diplomatic missions, including as ambassador to Madrid and Washington.

Two years later, on 7 October 1969, he became Prime Minister of the same government and delegated the portfolio of Foreign Affairs to Abdelhadi Boutaleb. On 6 August 1971, he resigned from his post as prime minister after the Skhirat coup. Mohammed Karim Lamrani succeeded him.

He then moved to Paris until 25 April 1974, where he was appointed Minister of State for Foreign Affairs in the Osman government. During his tenure, he was part of the Moroccan negotiators' committee of the Madrid Accords, establishing the formalities of the Spanish withdrawal from Western Sahara.

Personal life 
Laraki has one daughter named Amina Slaoui, who was the AMH Group president.

Death 
On 2 November 2020, at the age of 89, Laraki passed away.

References

Gallery 

1931 births
2020 deaths
Prime Ministers of Morocco
People from Fez, Morocco